Ricardo Ten Argilés (born 11 August 1975) is a swimmer from Spain.

Personal 
Ten was born on 11 August 1975 in Valencia. At the age of eight he touched high-voltage power lines; his injuries resulted in his arms and left leg being amputated.

Swimming 
Ten is an S5 type swimmer.

In 2007, Ten competed at the IDM German Open.  Ten competed at the 2010 Adapted Swimming World Championship in the Netherlands, where he won a gold medal, a silver medal and a bronze medal.   In advance of the competition,  he attended a swimming camp with the national team that was part of the Paralympic High Performance Program (HARP Program).  In 2010, he competed at the Tenerife International Open.  He competed at the 2011 IPC European Swimming Championships in Berlin, Germany, finishing fifth in the 50 meters butterfly. In 2012, he competed at the Paralympic Swimming Championship of Spain by Autonomous Communities. He competed at the 2013 IPC Swimming World Championships.

Paralympics 
Ten compete at the 1996 Summer Paralympics, 2000 Summer Paralympics, 2008 Summer Paralympics and 2012 Summer Paralympics.  In 1996, he finished second in the 100 meter breaststroke and third in the 4 x 50 meter 20 points medley relay race.  In 2000, he finished first in the 100 meter breaststroke and first in the 4 x 50 meter 20 points medley relay race. In 2008, he finished first in the 100 meter breaststroke.  In 2012, he finished third in the 100 meter breaststroke.

References

External links 
 
 

1975 births
Living people
Paralympic swimmers of Spain
Paralympic gold medalists for Spain
Paralympic silver medalists for Spain
Paralympic bronze medalists for Spain
Paralympic medalists in swimming
S5-classified Paralympic swimmers
Swimmers at the 1996 Summer Paralympics
Swimmers at the 2000 Summer Paralympics
Swimmers at the 2004 Summer Paralympics
Swimmers at the 2008 Summer Paralympics
Swimmers at the 2012 Summer Paralympics
Medalists at the 1996 Summer Paralympics
Medalists at the 2000 Summer Paralympics
Medalists at the 2008 Summer Paralympics
Medalists at the 2012 Summer Paralympics
Medalists at the World Para Swimming Championships
Medalists at the World Para Swimming European Championships
Spanish male breaststroke swimmers
Spanish male backstroke swimmers
Spanish male butterfly swimmers
Sportspeople from Valencia
20th-century Spanish people
21st-century Spanish people